Jim van Os (born 1960) is a Dutch academic and psychiatrist. He is Professor of Psychiatry and medical manager of the Brain Center at Utrecht University Medical Center, the Netherlands.

Career
Van Os studied medicine in Amsterdam, psychiatry in Jakarta, Casablanca, Bordeaux, and London, and subsequently epidemiology at the London School of Hygiene and Tropical Medicine. 

He was formerly Professor of Psychiatry, Chair of the Department of Psychiatry and Psychology, and Director of Psychiatric Services at the Maastricht University Medical Center. He is currently Professor of Psychiatry with a focus on psychiatric epidemiology and public mental health and medical manager of the Brain Center at Utrecht University Medical Centre, as well as visiting professor at the Institute of Psychiatry, King's College London, United Kingdom. 

In 2011 he was elected member of the Royal Netherlands Academy of Arts and Sciences. In 2014 he was listed in the Thomson Reuters Web of Science list of "the world’s most influential scientific minds of our time" (since 2014). He is on the editorial board of several major psychiatric journals, including Acta Psychiatrica Scandinavica, European Psychiatry, Psychological Medicine, Schizophrenia Research, and Schizophrenia Bulletin, additionally serving as an academic editor for PLOS One. He also served on the psychosis group for the DSM-5 Task Force. His colleagues have voted him "best psychiatrist in the Netherlands" multiple times.

Arguments that "schizophrenia" does not exist
In 2009, van Os proposed the retirement of the diagnosis, schizophrenia, citing its lack of validity and the risk of fundamental attribution error associated with the label. The label "schizophrenia" could cause difficulties on the clinician's part in communicating with the diagnosed person, due to erroneous preconceptions associated with the label. 

In its place, van Os proposed a broad and general syndromal definition, more suited to personal diagnosis, which would reduce attribution error.  He cited previous work by other researchers that explains psychosis as aberrant salience regulation.

In 2014 he explained his views in a TED talk.

In 2015 he co-authored an article in a national newspaper, suggesting that "schizo-labels" be abandoned and replaced with more scientific and patient-friendly terminology. The following week, his colleagues Rene Kahn, Iris Sommer, and Damiaan Denys published a counter-article, labeling Van Os and his colleagues as "antipsychiatrists".

In 2016 he published an editorial in the BMJ arguing that disease classifications should drop the concept of schizophrenia, as it is an unhelpful description of symptoms.

Partial bibliography
 
 
 
 
 
 Tamminga, C., Sirovatka, P., Regier, D.A. & Van Os, J. (2010) Deconstructing Psychosis: Refining the Research Agenda for DSM-V (Arlington, Virginia, American Psychiatric Association).
 Groot, P.C. & van Os, J. (2021) "Tapering Medication (Tapering Strips) as a Necessary Tool for a Meaningful Conversation in the Doctor’s Office" (pp. 259-285). In: P. Lehmann & C. Newnes (eds.), Withdrawal from Prescribed Psychotropic Drugs. Berlin / Lancaster: Peter Lehmann Publishing.

References

External links
 Psychosis research at Maastricht University by Jim van Os and Philippe Delespaul
 Research on cannabis
 Information at 2002 inauguration in Maastricht

1960 births
Living people
Dutch psychiatrists
Dutch public health doctors
Academics of King's College London
Fellows of King's College London
Cannabis researchers
Academic staff of Maastricht University
Members of the Royal Netherlands Academy of Arts and Sciences
Schizophrenia researchers